The 1995 Utah Utes football team represented the University of Utah as a member of the Western Athletic Conference (WAC) during the 1995 NCAA Division I-A football season. In their sixth season under head coach Ron McBride, the Utes compiled an overall record of 7–4 record with a mark of 6–2 against conference opponents, sharing the WAC title with Air Force, BYU, and Colorado State. Utah outscored its opponents 296 to 230. The Utes were not invited to bowl game, after playing in the postseason each of the three previous seasons. All four of Utah losses were at home; the Utes were perfect 4–0 on the road. The team played home games at Robert Rice Stadium in Salt Lake City.

The 1995 team won two games at home in fourth-quarter comebacks, against Fresno State and Air Force. The comeback against Air Force was won in miraculous fashion with quarterback Mike Fouts throwing a pair of touchdown passes in the final 41 seconds of the game, assisted by a rare onside kick recovery after the first touchdown pass.

Schedule

After the season

NFL Draft
One Utah players was selected in the 1996 NFL Draft.

References

Utah
Utah Utes football seasons
Western Athletic Conference football champion seasons
Utah Utes football